Custody is a 2017 French drama film directed by Xavier Legrand and starring Léa Drucker and Denis Ménochet. It was screened in the main competition section of the 74th Venice International Film Festival where it won the Silver Lion. At the 44th César Awards, Custody won the awards for Best Film, Best Actress (Drucker), and Best Original Screenplay.

Plot
Miriam Besson and Antoine Besson are a recently divorced couple. They have a daughter close to the age of eighteen, Joséphine, and an eleven-year-old son, Julien. Miriam wants to protect her son and keep him away from his father, whom she accuses of being violent. Therefore, during the custody court hearing, she asks for sole custody of the child, providing a letter from Julien saying that he does not want to see his father.

Despite Miriam's pleas, the judge grants shared custody and orders the child to spend alternate weekends with his father. Julien is frightened of his father and wants to protect his mother from the physical and psychological violence inflicted by Antoine.

Antoine wants to continue to exercise his power over Miriam and Julien with pressure and threats to the child. This attitude, and his aggressive outbursts, creates tension with his own parents who tell Antoine to leave their home, where he had been staying. Antoine then intimidates Julien into showing him where the family has moved to.

Antoine turns up outside the venue of Joséphine's 18th birthday party. During an argument he grabs his ex-wife by her throat, until her sister Sylvia intervenes, threatening to call the police if Antoine ever shows up again.

That night, while Miriam and Julien are sleeping at their home, Antoine tries to enter the apartment armed with a shotgun, which he fires into the door. A neighbour calls the police. Miriam and Julien barricade themselves in the bathroom, following advice from a police call centre, until police officers arrive and disarm and arrest Antoine.

Cast
 Léa Drucker as Miriam Besson
 Denis Ménochet as Antoine Besson
 Thomas Gioria as Julien Besson
 Mathilde Auneveux as Joséphine Besson
 Jean-Marie Winling as Joël Besson

Reception
On review aggregator website Rotten Tomatoes, the film has an approval rating of 95% based on 115 reviews, with an average rating of 7.8/10. The website's critical consensus reads, "Custody uses formal restraint—and a series of searing performances—to take a hard-hitting look at the often painful bond between parents and children." On Metacritic, the film has a weighted average score of 83 out of 100, based on 21 critics, indicating "universal acclaim", and is listed as a "Metacritic must-see".

For The Canadian Press, David Friend said, "Xavier Legrand captures unsettling performances from his entire cast, especially the young Thomas Gioria as the child caught in the midst of turmoil." Peter Rainer of Christian Science Monitor noted "the ordeal of the children is not skimped. They bear the brunt, and the legacy, of the anguish."

References

External links
 

2017 films
2017 drama films
2010s French-language films
French drama films
Febiofest award winners
Films about domestic violence
Films about divorce
French courtroom films
Best Film César Award winners
Films featuring a Best Actress César Award-winning performance
2010s French films